Oligostigma rufiterminalis is a moth in the family Crambidae. It was described by George Hampson in 1917. It is found on Madagascar.

References

Acentropinae
Moths described in 1917